WPOS-FM (102.3 MHz) is a Contemporary Christian music radio station licensed to Holland, Ohio, and serving the Toledo metropolitan area.  WPOS-FM is owned by The Maumee Valley Broadcasting Association, a non-profit 501(c)3 organization, although the station does air commercials to support its ministry.  The station is an affiliate of the Moody Radio network and Salem Radio Network.
 
WPOS-FM has an effective radiated power (ERP) of 6,000 watts.  The radio studios and transmitter are located at 7112 Angola Road in Holland.

Programming
Most of the day, WPOS-FM airs Contemporary Christian music.  Talk and teaching shows are heard in early mornings and evenings.  

Religious leaders with programs on WPOS-FM include Jim Daly, Charles Stanley, Nancy DeMoss Wolgemuth, Chuck Swindoll, Alistair Begg, David Jeremiah, James Dobson and John MacArthur.  These shows are brokered, where the hosts buy time on the station and may use their programs to seek donations to their ministries.

History
Originally it was powered at 3,000 watts and aired a mix of Christian hymns along with talk and teaching shows.  

The Maumee Valley Broadcasting Association acquired the construction permit in 1965 before the station was on the air.  Its studios and transmitter have always been located on Angola Road in Holland.  It has kept the same call sign through its history.

References

External links

POS
POS
Moody Radio affiliate stations